Film gris (French for "grey film"), a term coined by experimental filmmaker Thom Andersen, is a type of film noir which categorizes a unique series of films that were released between 1947 and 1951. They came in the context of the first wave of the communist investigations of the House Un-American Activities Committee.

Thematic elements
Films gris offer a leftist criticism of society in general, and of capitalism in particular. 
They typically examine such themes as the psychological damages of class, the false promises of middle class happiness, and the pitfalls of materialism.

Distinction from film noir
Film gris differs from film noir in some of the following ways:
 Film gris is a little more pessimistic and cynical than film noir. The dividing line between crime and law enforcement is often blurred.
 Films gris tend to blame society rather than the individual. For example, films gris will tend to focus less on what a criminal is doing, and more on how society has produced the criminal class.
 The audience identification is often with the collective in a way atypical of Hollywood films.
 The alluring and treacherous femme fatale’s motives are more obvious and easier to identify than in film noir.

List of films gris
Andersen identifies the following as films gris:

1947
Body and Soul
1948
Force of Evil
They Live by Night
1949
Thieves' Highway
Knock on Any Door
We Were Strangers
1950
The Asphalt Jungle
The Breaking Point
The Lawless
Night and the City
Try and Get Me! (The Sound of Fury)
1951
The Prowler
He Ran All the Way

List of film gris directors
Jules Dassin
Abraham Polonsky
Nicholas Ray
John Huston
Joseph Losey

See also 
 Neo-noir
 Film noir
 Message picture
 United States in the 1950s

Sources
 Andersen, Thom. "Red Hollywood." Literature and the Visual Arts in Contemporary Society. Eds. Suzanne Ferguson and Barbara S. Groseclose. Columbus: Ohio State University Press. (1985).
 Hirsch, Joshua. "Film Gris Reconsidered." The Journal of Popular Film and Television 34.2. (2006).
 Maland, Charles. "Film Gris: Crime, Critique, and Cold War Culture in 1951." Film Criticism 26.3. (2002).

References

Film genres
Anti-capitalism
Film noir
Criticism of capitalism
Hollywood blacklist
1940s in film
1950s in film
Film genres particular to the United States